Paul Coughlin (born 19 December 1978) is a Scottish darts player currently playing in PDC Challenge Tour events. He qualified for the 2015 BDO World Darts Championship. Coughlin plays as part of Team BTO Behind the Oche

Career
In 2013, Coughlin won the Latvia Open and in 2014 he won the Hungarian Open. He qualified for the 2015 BDO World Darts Championship, he lost to Karel Sedláček of the Czech Republic in the Preliminary round.

World Championship results

BDO
 2015: Last 40 (lost to Karel Sedláček 2–3)

External links
Paul Coughlin's profile and stats on Darts Database

References

http://www.behindtheoche.com/home/4558526231/Paul-Coughlin-wins-Season-1-BTO-Premiership-Darts/6397374 
https://web.archive.org/web/20150923183116/http://www.bdodarts.com/player.aspx?pid=7ec6965c-daae-4c6b-ae3d-e7e5fe553f5d 
http://www.thecourier.co.uk/news/local/angus-the-mearns/flying-scotsman-leads-auld-enemy-reservoir-darts-clash-in-forfar-1.722811
http://www.eveningtelegraph.co.uk/news/local/angus/tungsten-tussle-aimed-at-angus-1.677047

Living people
Scottish darts players
British Darts Organisation players
1978 births